Tapirira mexicana is a species of rainforest tree in the family Anacardiaceae of Central America and Mexico (in the states of Chiapas, Oaxaca, Puebla, and Veracruz).  The tree requires intense sunlight for its saplings to establish.

References

mexicana
Trees of Central America
Trees of Chiapas
Trees of Oaxaca
Trees of Puebla
Trees of Veracruz
Trees of Mexico
Cloud forest flora of Mexico